Kerala State Water Transport Department (SWTD) is a governmental department that regulates the inland navigation systems in the Indian state of Kerala and provides inland water transport facilities. It stands for catering to the traffic needs of the inhabitants of the waterlogged areas of the Districts of Alappuzha, Kottayam, Kollam, Ernakulam, Kannur and Kasaragod. The department is headed by the State Minister in charge of transportation.

This system consists of 1895 kilometers of waterways, including navigable rivers, backwaters, and man made cross canals. Most of these are in Travancore-Cochin region. Of the 44 rivers in Kerala, 41 of the westward flowing rivers combine with back waters and man made canals to form an integral part of inland navigation system.

Even through it is a commercial department, its functioning is like a service Department, ever since ‘Transportation’ came under "Essential Service" in Kerala. The Department transports about 150 lakhs of passengers per annum using Wooden/Steel and fibreglass passenger boats.

A study conducted in 2011-2012 by CPPR on Inland Water Transport in Kochi shows that around 56 percent of the passengers expressed their dissatisfaction over the quality of ferry service.

History

The Kerala State Water Transport Department formed during 1968 with its headquarters (Directorate) in the District of Alappuzha. The objective of the department was to provide transport facilities and cargo transportation to the people residing in the waterlogged areas at cheaper rates. Construction of roads, bridges and roadways shortened the operation of the department to passenger transport only, providing backwater transport through ferries. The system is free of pollution, accidents, and is affordable. The government has now mooted setting up Kerala State Boat Jetty Corporation with a vision to convert the boat jetties in Kerala to world class standards. This corporation will enhance and develop the boat jetties into commercial assets for the state. Some jetties were identified for development like Marine drive jetty, Kaavalam jetty and Kumaran jetty. Jetty-based shopping centers and cafeterias are sources of huge returns. As per the new vision every jetty will be a centre for excellent performance. Local art forms, sports meets, family meetings, marriages, proposals will be hosted in jetties. Thus people become interlaced with boat jetty inculcating in them a sense of pride, prejudice and personality. The system provides on average 79,000 km of service to 80,000 people through its 13 stations and 81 boats daily.

Organisation structure

The Director is the Head of the Department, who reports to the Ministry of Transport in the state. During formation, the service operation was only in the Districts of Alappuzha, Kottayam & Kollam with the headquarters in Alappuzha as its nerve centre of all the functions and activities. Later the functions and activities were decentralised by establishing an office for the Mechanical Engineer and three Regional Offices in the Districts of Ernakulam, Kottayam (Changanassery) and Kasargode, headed by three Senior Superintendents. Now the Department has thirteen Stations Offices as given below.

 Alappuzha
 Kottayam
 Kollam
 Edathua
 Pulinkunnu
 Nedumudy
 Muhamma
 Vaikom
 Panavally
 Thrikkarippur
 Changanassery
 Kavalam
 Ernakulam
 
The Controlling Officers of these Stations are Station Masters. The service operation of boats are under the immediate control of the Station Masters of these stations.

The function of the Department are trifurcated into three wings
 Management - Under the control of Administrative Assistant
 Operation - Under the Traffic Superintendent
 Repair & Maintenance -Under the Mechanical Engineer

Fleet

The department operates about 85 ferries all across Kerala. Earlier the Department was using only conventional type wooden (well seasoned teak wood) passenger boats for transporting passengers. Now the department has switched over to the use of modern fibreglass/steel passenger boats. It owns and operates the first and the only solar ferry in India, ADITYA, a 75-passenger boat, in the Vaikom-Thavanakadavu sector.

 Boat Capacity - 50 to 150 passengers (wooden boats) 
 Speed of operation - 10 to 15 km per hour 
 Boat Size- Length: 20 to 35 m, Width: 3 to 4.5 m, Depth: 2 m
 Empty Weight - 5 to 15 tonnes 
 Crew per boat - 5 max.

Schedule

Please visit Official site of Kerala State Water Transport Department  for detailed schedule, route, fare and other queries.

Tourism Initiative

Realising the tourism potential of Kerala, the department is attempting to garner worldwide attention, mainly of tourists. The new website (swtd.gov.in)offer details of the service trips, which are fast becoming popular among tourists as one of the most affordable modes to enjoy the beauty of the scenic Kerala backwaters. The website is expected to help tourists in a major way and thus, make the department more popular among them.

It has interesting links, one of which is "" giving details of every trip of the department, with the starting time. A brief description of the sights one can behold en route has been provided. For instance, the 29-km Alappuzha-Edathua trip, which costs a mere Rs.10, covers some major landmarks: the finishing point of the internationally acclaimed Nehru Trophy Boat Race, Chavara Bhavan, and ancient temples and lamp posts, apart from lush paddy fields.

Under the "Tourism" head, the site offers useful information on the popular Kollam-Alappuzha tourist boat service, with tariffs and other operational details. 
SEE KUTTANADU passenger-cum-tourist service is another service offered by the department.

External sources
Kerala Government Site

References

Government departments of Kerala
Water transport in Kerala
Tourism in Kerala